Khouw Tjeng Po, -titulair der Chinezen (born in 1838 — died in 1882) was a Chinese-Indonesian magnate and landlord in Batavia, capital of the Dutch East Indies (now Indonesia).

Khouw was the youngest son of Khouw Tian Sek, Luitenant-titulair der Chinezen (died in 1843), a Batavia magnate and patriarch of the Khouw family of Tamboen. He was part of the Cabang Atas or the Chinese gentry (baba bangsawan) of colonial Indonesia. He had two elder brothers,  Khouw Tjeng Tjoan and  Khouw Tjeng Kee, and two sisters, Khouw Giok Nio and Khouw Kepeng Nio. Khouw, his father and brothers held the rank of Luitenant der Chinezen, awarded to high-ranking Chinese officials of the civil bureaucracy in the Dutch East Indies. The title had been granted on an honorary basis without administrative responsibilities. 

Prior to his Chinese lieutenancy, he had the hereditary title of Sia as the son of a Chinese officer. From the mid-nineteenth century until the end of colonial rule, the family was acknowledged as the wealthiest Chinese-Indonesian family in Batavia.

The  died in 1882. He was married to Gouw Hok Nio. According to Arnold Wright, a younger son - Khouw Oen Hoen - was the head of the family at the start of the twentieth century.

References

1838 births
1882 deaths
People from Batavia, Dutch East Indies
People of the Dutch East Indies
Indonesian people of Chinese descent
Indonesian Hokkien people
Kapitan Cina
Khouw family of Tamboen
Sia (title)
Indonesian landlords